The following lists events that happened during 1978 in South Africa.

Incumbents
 State President:
 Nico Diederichs (until 21 August).
 Marais Viljoen (acting from 21 August until 9 October).
 John Vorster (from 10 October).
 Prime Minister:
 John Vorster (until 2 October).
 P.W. Botha (from 9 October).
 Chief Justice: Frans Lourens Herman Rumpff.

Events

January
 Former African National Congress member Steve Mtshali, state witness in various trials, is shot and wounded.

February
 2 – Guerrillas attack the Daveyton police station.
 2 – Kaiser Matanzima breaks all diplomatic ties with South Africa and announces that all South African Defence Force members seconded to the Transkei Army will leave Transkei by 31 March.
 2 – The Eastern Cape Attorney-General refuses to prosecute policemen involved in the arrest and detention of Steve Biko.
 A bomb capable of destroying a 22-storey building is found in a Johannesburg office block and defused.

March
 10 – A bomb explodes outside the offices of the Bantu Affairs building in Port Elizabeth, killing one civilian.

April
 14 – Abel Mthembu, former deputy president of the ANC in the Transvaal, turns state witness at the Pretoria ANC trial.

May
 4 – The South African Defence Force launches an airborne attack on Cassinga in Angola during Operation Reindeer.
 4 – Azanian People's Organisation members Ishmael Mkhabela and Lybon Mabasa are arrested in Soweto.

August
 21 – Marais Viljoen becomes acting State President of South Africa.
 23 – Operation Saffraan, a South African Defence Force retaliatory raid, is carried out in Zambia.

September
 The African National Congress attempts to kill about 500 of its own cadres by poisoning their food because an infiltrated enemy agent could not be identified.

October
 9 – P.W. Botha succeeds John Vorster as Prime Minister of South Africa.
 10 – John Vorster becomes State President of South Africa.
 31 – The South African Railways sets a still unbeaten world rail speed record.

December
 A bomb explodes at the Soweto Community Council offices.

Unknown date
 The South African Defence Force attacks several SWAPO bases in Angola during Operation Bruilof.
 The SADF's 32 Battalion moves into southern Angola to flush out SWAPO members during Operation Seiljag.
 George Bizos becomes a senior member of the Johannesburg Bar.
 The Atomic Energy Corporation builds South Africa's first nuclear weapon device.
 South Korea ends diplomatic relations with South Africa it established in 1961, in protest of apartheid.

Births
 23 February – Siyabonga Shibe, actor
 24 February – Bolla Conradie, rugby player
 28 February – Rowen Fernández, football player
 22 March – Heinz Winckler, singer, winner of Idols South Africa (season 1)
 27 March – Professor (musician), recording artist
 3 April – John Smit, Springboks, rugby captain
 6 April – Jaco van der Westhuyzen, Springbok rugby player
 6 May – Danie Rossouw, Jaco van der Westhuyzen
 8 May – Nkhensani Kubayi-Ngubane, national minister
 25 June – De Wet Barry, Springbok rugby player
 30 June – Stella Ndabeni-Abrahams, national minister
 8 August – Lawrence Sephaka, Springbok rugby player
 10 August – Karen Zoid, singer
 23 October – Wayne Julies, Springbok rugby player
 7 November – Katlego Danke, actress
 20 November – Neil de Kock, Springbok rugby player
 18 December – Lulu Dikana, singer, older sister of singer Zonke (d. 2014)
 29 December – André Pretorius, Springbok rugby player

Deaths
 8 January – Rick Turner, activist and academic. (b. 1941)
 12 January – Monty Naicker, medical doctor and activist. (b. 1910)
 27 February – Robert Sobukwe, political activist. (b. 1924)
 6 July – Papwa Sewgolum, golfer. (b. 1930)
 21 August – Nico Diederichs, State President of South Africa. (b. 1903)

Railways

Locomotives
 Three new Cape gauge locomotive types enter service on the South African Railways:
 August – The first of 58 Class 34-800 General Motors Electro-Motive Division type GT26MC diesel-electric locomotives.
 The first of one hundred Class 7E electric locomotives, the SAR's first 25 kV AC locomotive.
 The first of twenty-five , Series 1 electric locomotives, the SAR's first 50 kV AC locomotive, on the Sishen-Saldanha iron ore line.
 31 October – SAR Class 6E1, Series 4 locomotive no.
 The SAR rebuilds Class 6E1, Series 5 no. E1600, a 3 kV DC electric locomotive, as a test-bed for use during 25 kV AC electrification.

Sports

Motorsport
 4 March – The South African Grand Prix takes place at Kyalami.

References

South Africa
Years in South Africa
History of South Africa